Morgagni can refer to:

Giovanni Battista Morgagni, an Italian anatomist 
Structures and conditions named after this person:
Morgagni's hernia
Foramina of Morgagni (sternocostal triangle)
Hydatid of Morgagni
Sinus of Morgagni (aorta)
Sinus of Morgagni (pharynx)
Pillars (or Columns) of Morgagni
Manlio Morgagni, Italian Fascist
Tullo Morgagni, Italian journalist and sports race director